Jasminum multipartitum, the starry wild jasmine, African jasmine, or imfohlafohlane, is a species of jasmine, in the family Oleaceae, that is native to Southern Africa.

Description
This 3 metre tall scrambling climber, that can also be grown as a 1.5m tall shrub, thrives in the sun or semi-shade. It produces masses of white, scented, star-shaped flowers and it attracts a variety of birds. It flowers from late spring to summer.

Distribution
This is one of approximately ten species of Jasmine that occur in South Africa. Native to Mozambique, Zimbabwe, Eswatini and South Africa, Starry Wild Jasmine is naturally found in the woodlands of the Eastern Cape and Kwazulu Natal, as well as inland as far as Johannesburg.

Etymology
'Jasminum' is a Latinized form of the Arabic word, 'yasemin' for sweetly scented plants.

References

multipartitum
Creepers of South Africa
Flora of South Africa
Flora of Mozambique
Flora of Zimbabwe
Flora of Swaziland
Garden plants
Plants described in 1844